The Battle of Masulipatnam was a battle between the Dutch East India Company (VOC) and English East India Company (EIC) during the Franco-Dutch War, in India, near Machilipatnam. During the siege of São Tomé 13 Dutch ships clashed with 10 English ships in a battle which ended in a Dutch victory.

Prelude

In 1671, even before the outbreak of Franco-Dutch War, the French navy had placed a powerful squadron under the command of Admiral de la Haye at the disposal of the French East India Company. In full knowledge that war with the Dutch Republic would be declared next year, it was deemed opportune to send a powerful fleet to Asia to be in a position to strike when news was received that hostilities had commenced. La Haye had been ordered to seek a firm foothold in Asia to fortify and defend, sending all but two of his ships home. It was with this object in mind that the French captured Trincomalee, the crucial strategic bay on Ceylon’s east coast, in March 1672 and São Tomé from the Dutch in July 1672.

But taking São Tomé was a mistake. It had formerly been a Portuguese town and the Portuguese government still hoped to see it returned to them. Situated close to Madras, the French capture of the town also angered their English allies since it placed a powerful commercial rival right on the doorstep of what was the most important EIC settlement in India. Finally, by conquering the city, the French gained the enmity of the Abul Hasan Qutb Shah, the sultan of Golconda, the sovereign of the city. Golconda raised an army and set about to besiege the town from the summer of 1672 onwards. This first siege was in fact broken by the French, but by June 1673, the VOC, having secured its position in Southeast Asia by defeating the French garrison left behind in Trincomalee, joined forces with the Qutb Shahi and the town was besieged again, on land by the forces of Golconda, and on the sea side by the fleet of the VOC under Rijcklof van Goens.

The battle
During the siege a British fleet appeared on the Coromandel coast, consisting of ten powerful English East India Company ships. It would have been possible for this fleet to join forces with the remaining part of the French navy, to relieve São Tomé together and drive the Dutch out of the area. But the English made no attempt to do so and chose to remain on their own. Van Goens, who does not seem to have heard of the arrival of this naval force, had sent a fleet of thirteen Dutch East India Company ships to Masulipatnam, an important office, north of São Tomé on the coast of Coromandel, to protect it against the attacks of the French admiral de la Haye, who seemed to be aiming for that post.

Cornelis van Quaelbergen to whom the command of this fleet was entrusted, met the British fleet on the first of September 1673, five or six miles from Masulipatnam. Soon the battle began, which was fought vigorously on both sides. After three or four hours of fighting the Dutch finally emerged victorious, taking the ship of the English Vice-Admiral of 40 guns, that of the Rear-Admiral of 34 guns, and a third of 36 guns. The others were chased away, and soon left the Indian seas altogether.

Aftermath
The siege of São Tomé would last until late August 1674, when the French garrison capitulated to Van Goens. The capitulation of the French garrison was due to its lack of supplies of food and gunpowder. As the VOC had agreed with the sultan of Golconda that the town would be handed back and demolished, the Dutch would not retain the port. This would also benefit the EIC officials in Madras and they were very eager to see the destruction of this neighbouring town, going so far as to write to the sultan, urging him to demolish it quickly. Still The French and English East India Companies had been unable to seriously undermine the VOC’s strong position in both the intercontinental route and in intra-Asian trades during the war.

Notes

Sources
 
 
 

Conflicts in 1673
1673 in the Dutch Republic
Naval battles of the Third Anglo-Dutch War
Naval battles involving the Dutch Republic
Naval battles involving England
Naval battles of the Franco-Dutch War